is a former Japanese football player.

Playing career
Yoshida was born in Nagasaki Prefecture on September 8, 1966. After graduating from Shimabara Commercial High School, he joined Japan Soccer League club Toyota Motors (later Nagoya Grampus Eight) in 1985. In 1992, Japan Soccer League was folded and founded new league J1 League. He debuted in June 1993 in J1 and played several matches in 1993. However he could not play at all in the match in 1994 and retired end of 1994 season.

Club statistics

References

External links

1966 births
Living people
Association football people from Nagasaki Prefecture
Japanese footballers
Japan Soccer League players
J1 League players
Nagoya Grampus players

Association football forwards